is a Japanese manga artist best known in various manga communities in Japan and overseas for his work in Spriggan and later in Until Death Do Us Part.

Biography
In 1996, he was a guest of honor with fellow Spriggan collaborator Ryōji Minagawa in a comic convention in Portugal. The two then worked on Kyo.

He became obscure from the manga community after his work in Spriggan was completed, though he resurfaced in 1998 to lend a hand in the creation of the Spriggan movie. He had recently been involved in doing Alcbane, Kurando and Until Death Do Us Part.

Works

Alcbane: Story
Kurando: Story
Kyō: Story
Until Death Do Us Part: Story
Spriggan: Story

References

External links
 
 Hiroshi Takashige on Twitter

Living people
Manga artists
Year of birth missing (living people)